Casimir Liberski (born 1988) is a pianist and composer.

He attended Berklee College of Music from 2006. Around 2010, he appeared on Charnett Moffett's album Treasure. Liberski composed the music for the 2014 film Tokyo Fiancée.

Selected discography
2008: "Evanescences (featuring Tyshawn Sorey and Thomas Morgan)" (Dalang!Records)
2009: Dedications (Jazz Revelation Records)
2010: Treasure (Motéma Music)
2012: Defense Mechanism (by Louis de Mieulle)
2012: "The Caveless Wolf - Casimir Liberski Trio" (Dalang!Records)
2012: "Atomic Rabbit" (Dalang!Records)
2014: "Tokyo Fiancée" (Dalang!Records)
2015: Stars, Plants & Bugs (by Louis de Mieulle)
2016: Ukiyo (by Kaoru Tanaka)
2016: Lagune (by JF Foliez)
2017: Middle of Somewhere
2019: Cosmic Liberty

References

External links 
 Official site

1988 births
Belgian jazz pianists
Living people
21st-century pianists